Humberto Zurita (born September 2, 1954) is a Mexican actor, director and producer.

Zurita, one of 10 siblings from Torreón, Coahuila, is best known as actor, director and producer of telenovelas.

Acting career
He made his first stage appearances in amateur performances of musicals including Tommy and Jesus Christ Superstar. He graduated from CUT (Centro Universitario de Teatro - the University Theatrical Centre) of UNAM (Universidad Nacional Autonoma - National Autonomous University of Mexico), the famous educational institute for acting in Mexico.

As a stage actor, he acted in various plays from classical to modern, as well as absurd theater. Humberto Zurita played classical roles like Hamlet but he also appeared in various contemporary plays like M. Butterfly. As theatrical producer and director he staged The Protagonist (El Protagonista) by the Argentine playwright Luis Agustoni (also acting in the title role as Fernando) and Haute surveillance (Severa Vigilancia) by Jean Genet.
 
In television, he started his acting career with Televisa in the late 1970s. He obtained his first starring role as Alberto Limonta in the 1981 production of El derecho de nacer. Two years later he took the role of Eddie in the Mexican production of P.S. Your Cat Is Dead, with Manuel Ojeda as Jimmy. He combined a film career with his television productions such as the telenovela Cañaveral de Pasiones.

In 1997, citing creative reasons he and his wife, Christian Bach, moved to TV Azteca. In a bold move he produced and starred in El candidato an interactive telenovela about current Mexican political issues a year prior to the 2000 Mexican presidential elections. He produced Azul Tequila (the only telenovela exported to the UK). In Mexico he has produced four films to date.

Since 2003, he has worked for Argos Television, an independent media company that has produced telenovelas for TV Azteca and Telemundo Network associated company.

Filmography

Actor

Producer

Awards and nominations 
For Actor And Producer

External links
 

1954 births
Living people
Mexican male film actors
Mexican male stage actors
Mexican male telenovela actors
Mexican telenovela directors
Mexican telenovela producers
Mexican film producers
Male actors from Coahuila
People from Torreón